Alannah Myles is the debut album by Canadian singer Alannah Myles, released on March 28, 1989. It includes the worldwide hit single "Black Velvet". The album was a big seller worldwide, and reached number one for two weeks in her native Canada, number 5 on the Billboard 200 in the US and number 3 in the UK Albums Chart. The album cover comes from a photoshoot by Canadian photographer Deborah Samuel.

Track listing

Personnel 
Musicians
 Alannah Myles – lead vocals, backing vocals
 David Tyson – keyboards, bass (1), backing vocals (1), synthesized fretless bass (3)
 Scott Humphrey – keyboard programming 
 Bob Bartolucci – guitars
 Kurt Schefter – guitars
 David Wipper – acoustic guitars, mandolin
 Steve Webster – bass (1, 2, 4–10)
 Jørn Andersen – drums (1-8, 10)
 Gary Craig – drums (9)
 Michael Sloski – percussion
 John Johnson – saxophones
 Rick Waychesko – trumpet
 Jackie Richardson – backing vocals (1)
 Christopher Ward – backing vocals (1, 2)
 Peter Fredette – backing vocals (4, 6, 7)
 Dean McTaggart – backing vocals (4, 6)
 Lisa Dalbello – backing vocals (6, 8)

Production
 Christopher Ward – executive producer 
 David Tyson – producer 
 Kevin Doyle – engineer, mixing (2, 3, 6)
 Pete Willis – engineer 
 Tom Eymundson – assistant engineer 
 Steve Harrison – assistant engineer 
 Mike Jones – assistant engineer
 Martin Lee – assistant engineer
 Paul Seeley – assistant engineer
 Paul Shubat – assistant engineer
 Lou Solakofski – assistant engineer
 Paul Lani – mixing (1, 4, 5, 7–10)
 David Dorn – mix assistant
 Atlantic Studios (New York City, New York, USA) – mixing location
 George Marino – mastering at Sterling Sound (New York City, New York)
 Bob Defrin – art direction
 Valerie Sinclair – lettering design
 Deborah Samuel – cover photography

Charts

Weekly charts

Year-end charts

Certifications

References 

1989 debut albums
Alannah Myles albums
Atlantic Records albums
Juno Award for Album of the Year albums